Looking for Trouble is a 1926 American silent Western film directed by Robert N. Bradbury and starring Jack Hoxie, Marceline Day and Clark Comstock.

Cast
 Jack Hoxie as Jack William Pepper 
 Marceline Day as Tulip Hellier 
 J. Gordon Russell as Jasper Murchison 
 Clark Comstock as Jim Hellier 
 Edmund Cobb as Phil Curtis 
 Bud Osborne as Lou Burkhold 
 Peggy Montgomery as Laura Burkhold 
 William J. Dyer as Sheriff Tom Plump

References

External links
 

1926 films
1926 Western (genre) films
1920s English-language films
Universal Pictures films
Films directed by Robert N. Bradbury
American black-and-white films
Silent American Western (genre) films
1920s American films